Lya  may refer to:

 LYA (airport), an airport serves Luoyang, China
 Lya (DC Comics), a fictional character
 Lya (given name), a feminine given name
 Lyman-alpha line (Lyα), a spectral line of hydrogen.